Masbate Cathedral, formally known as the Cathedral-Parish of Saint Anthony of Padua, is the Roman Catholic church located along Quezon Street in Masbate City, Masbate, Philippines. Founded in 1578 by Spanish missionaries, it is presently the cathedral or seat of the Roman Catholic Diocese of Masbate. The present pastor and rector of the cathedral is Rev. Fr. Ely Alvarez.

History
The parish was founded in 1578 by Spanish missionaries, who placed the new church under the patronage of the Archdiocese of Nueva España. With the canonical erection of the first local church in the Philippines in 1581, it became part of the Diocese of Manila. In 1595, it became part of the newly established Diocese of Nueva Cáceres when the Bicol region was given its own local church. In 1951, the parish became part of the newly erected Roman Catholic Diocese of Sorsogon, of which the Most Rev. Teopisto Alberto was its first Bishop. Then parish priest Msgr. Arnulfo Arcilla (later made bishop of Sorsogon) laid down the foundation of the first structures of the cathedral-parish in 1954. On March 23, 1968, the civil province of Masbate was declared an independent diocese from Sorsogon, and Saint Anthony of Padua Parish was made the cathedral or seat of the Roman Catholic Diocese of Masbate.

A major repair on the building was done during the administration of the first Bishop of Masbate, the Most Rev. Porfirio R. Iligan. Expansions and other improvements followed later under the supervision of its succeeding cathedral rectors. The present cathedral structure preserves the center floor, the aisle, and some vestiges of the cross-shaped part of the ceiling, thanks to Bishop Joel Baylon's call for church renovation. The cathedral was blessed and dedicated on September 25, 2004.

Pastors
Below is the recent list of parish priests / cathedral rectors.

See also
Roman Catholic Diocese of Masbate

External links
Diocese of Masbate

Resources
The 2016–2017 Catholic Directory of the Philippines (published by Claretian Publications for the Catholic Bishops' Conference of the Philippines, June 2016)

Roman Catholic churches in Masbate
Roman Catholic cathedrals in the Philippines